Yurmash (Yurmaş) is a rural locality (a village) in Nikolsky Selsoviet, Nurimanovsky District, Bashkortostan, Russia. The population was 82 as of 2010. There is 1 street.

Geography 
Yurmash is located 8 km east of Krasnaya Gorka (the district's administrative centre) by road. Baykal is the nearest rural locality.

References 

Rural localities in Nurimanovsky District